Mikhail Borovitinov (2 August 1874 in Saint Petersburg, Russia – died unknown) was a Russian lawyer and leader of the Russian Imperial Finnish Senate (Prime Minister of Finland) in the years 1913–1917, heading its Home Office.

Borovitinov received his law degree at the University of St. Petersburg in 1896 . After that, he pursued post-graduate studies, serving in the Russian Ministry of Justice.

Borovitinov was member of the International Prison Congress held in Washington in 1910.

Mihail Borovitinov began his service in Finland 28 April 1911, when he moved to Finland as a Head of the Chancellery of the Governor-General of Finland Franz Albert Seyn. Seyn had such a high regard for Borovitinov that on 16 May 1913 he was made Vice-President of the Imperial Finnish Senate.

The service of both Borovitinov and Franz Albert Seyn ended with the arrival of news on March 15, 1917 of the abdication of Nicholas II of Russia. The next day, Seyn and Borovitinov was arrested and taken in custody by train to St. Petersburg.  He was freed in the autumn, and his subsequent fate is unknown.

References 
 Håkon Holmberg: (Keisarillisen) Suomen senaatin talousosaston puheenjohtajat, jäsenet ja virkamiehet 1909-1918 – elämäkerrallinen luettelo, Helsinki, 1964.
 Kari O. Virtanen: Ahdistettu kansakunta 1890–1917, WSOY, Porvoo/Helsinki, 1974, .
 Pertti Luntinen: F.A.Seyn – A Political Biography of a Tsarist Imperialist as Administrator of Finland, Studia Historica 19, Suomen Historiallinen Seura, Helsinki, 1985, .

1874 births
Lawyers from Saint Petersburg
Saint Petersburg State University alumni
Year of death missing
Finnish senators
Russian expatriates in Finland
Prisoners of the Peter and Paul Fortress
Lawyers from the Russian Empire